Rey Evangelista (born December 28, 1971) is a Filipino retired professional basketball player who played for Purefoods franchise in the Philippine Basketball Association during his entire career. He was a one-time Best Player of the Conference awardee in 2002. He was known as a great defensive player and a left-handed shooter. He is now a politician who serving as a city councilor for Ormoc City.

Player profile
Rey hails from Ormoc, Leyte. He started out as a volleyball player during his high school days at St. Peter's College. He shifted to basketball because people noticed he is a high leaper and is also good at positional plays. Rey completed a course in Agribusiness at the Visayan State College of Agriculture and played for the VSCA team that was crowned champion of the State Colleges and Universities Athletic Association Region 8 meet.

He tried out at University of Santo Tomas and made it to the Glowing Goldies lineup under coach Aric del Rosario. Rey is a masteral student at UST and a cousin of UST's big boy Raymond Fran. He saw action for Nikon Home Appliances in the Philippine Basketball League in 1993 and turn pro in the following year. 

Rey was the second overall pick in the 1994 PBA draft, chosen by Purefoods TJ Hotdogs. In his first season, Rey was the only rookie included in the Philippine team that went to Hiroshima, Japan for the Asian Games. Most fans and the PBA press corps believes he should be the season's rookie of the year and Rey had a lot of sympathizers when his name was not called during the PBA annual awards night. He spent all of his 14 seasons in the PBA with the Purefoods franchise and retired from active playing in 2008.

References

External links
http://www.pba-online.net/profile/Rey-Evangelista/

1971 births
Living people
Asian Games competitors for the Philippines
Basketball players at the 1994 Asian Games
Basketball players from Leyte (province)
Filipino men's basketball players
Magnolia Hotshots draft picks
Magnolia Hotshots players
People from Ormoc
Philippine Basketball Association All-Stars
Philippine Basketball Association players with retired numbers
Philippines men's national basketball team players
Small forwards
UST Growling Tigers basketball players